Craig Stirk (born 3 August 1957) is a South African cricketer. He played in 43 first-class and 34 List A matches from 1979/80 to 1990/91.

References

External links
 

1957 births
Living people
South African cricketers
Border cricketers
KwaZulu-Natal cricketers
Northerns cricketers
Cricketers from Durban